Massachusetts Senate's 3rd Essex district in the United States is one of 40 legislative districts of the Massachusetts Senate. It covers portions of Essex county. Democrat Brendan Crighton of Lynn has represented the district since 2018.

Locales represented
The district includes the following localities:
 Lynn
 Lynnfield
 Marblehead
 Nahant
 Saugus
 Swampscott

The current district geographic boundary overlaps with those of the Massachusetts House of Representatives' 8th Essex, 9th Essex, 10th Essex, 11th Essex, 20th Middlesex, and 16th Suffolk districts.

Former locales

The district previously covered the following:
 Andover, circa 1860s
 Boxford, circa 1860s
 Haverhill, circa 1860s
 Lawrence, circa 1860s
 Methuen, circa 1860s
 North Andover, circa 1860s

Senators 
 George L. Davis, circa 1859 
 Horace C. Bacon, circa 1874
 James Shaw
 Charles Donnell Brown
 John Stoddart
 Cornelius F. Haley, circa 1935-1945

Images
Portraits of legislators

See also
 List of Massachusetts Senate elections
 List of Massachusetts General Courts
 List of former districts of the Massachusetts Senate
 Other Essex County districts of the Massachusett Senate: 1st, 2nd; 1st Essex and Middlesex; 2nd Essex and Middlesex
 Essex County districts of the Massachusetts House of Representatives: 1st, 2nd, 3rd, 4th, 5th, 6th, 7th, 8th, 9th, 10th, 11th, 12th, 13th, 14th, 15th, 16th, 17th, 18th

References

External links
 Ballotpedia
  (State Senate district information based on U.S. Census Bureau's American Community Survey).
 League of Women Voters of Marblehead

Senate 
Government of Essex County, Massachusetts
Massachusetts Senate